David Sills may refer to:

 David Sills (judge) (1938–2011), American jurist
 David Sills (American football) (born 1996), American football player
 David Sills IV, founder of Eastern Christian Academy